Ray Taylor may refer to:
 Ray Taylor (director) (1888–1952), American film director
 Ray Taylor (English footballer) (1930–2012), footballer for Huddersfield Town, Southport Frickley and Denaby United
 Ray Taylor (Australian footballer) (born 1947), Australian rules footballer for North Melbourne
 Ray Taylor (politician) (1923–2015), American politician in the state of Iowa
 Raymond Taylor (1910–?), American baseball catcher in the Negro leagues
 Ray Washington Traylor Jr. (1963–2004), American professional wrestler who used the ring name Big Boss Man
 Ray Taylor (EastEnders), fictional character in EastEnders, played by Dorian Lough in 2005
 Ray Taylor (EastEnders: Perfectly Frank), fictional character played by Tony Osoba in the 2003 spin-off EastEnders: Perfectly Frank
 Ray Taylor, a character in The Angry Hills